Siege artillery is heavy artillery primarily used in military attacks on fortified positions. At the time of the American Civil War, the U.S. Army classified its artillery into three types, depending on the gun's weight and intended use. Field artillery were light pieces that often traveled with the armies.  Siege and garrison artillery were heavy pieces that could be used either in attacking or defending fortified places. Seacoast artillery were the heaviest pieces and were intended to be used in permanent fortifications along the seaboard. They were primarily designed to fire on attacking warships . The distinctions are somewhat arbitrary, as field, siege and garrison, and seacoast artillery were all used in various attacks and defenses of fortifications. This article will focus on the use of heavy artillery in the attack of fortified places during the American Civil War.

The weight and size of siege artillery prevented it from regularly travelling with the armies. When needed, siege artillery and other material needed for siege operations were assembled into what was called a siege train and transported to the army. In the American Civil War, the siege train was always transported to the area of the siege by water.

The siege trains of the Civil War consisted almost exclusively of guns and mortars. Guns fired projectiles on horizontal trajectory and could batter heavy construction with solid shot or shell at long or short range, destroy fort parapets, and dismount cannon. Mortars fired shells in a high arcing trajectory to reach targets behind obstructions, destroying construction and personnel.

Pre-war siege artillery

Prior to the war, the U.S. Army had a variety of iron smoothbore siege guns (12-pounders, 18-pounders and 24-pounders) and howitzers (24-pounder and 8-inch) . None of these pieces were used during the war as siege artillery. The advent of rifled artillery made them obsolete.

Federal siege train

Mortars

Three primary types of mortars were used during the war: siege & garrison (light), seacoast (heavy) and Coehorns are also classified as siege & garrison.   While guns were intended to batter down the walls of a fortification during a siege, mortars were designed to fire explosive shells over the walls of the fortification, killing the men inside, and forcing others to stay in bombproof shelters, or preventing the gunners from serving their guns and repairing damage caused by the bombardment. Mortars could also destroy structures inside the fortification such as barracks and kitchens which would normally stay unharmed from standard guns. Heavier mortar shells could penetrate magazines and many bombproof shelters.

In defense of fortifications, siege and garrison mortars could harass work parties constructing siege batteries and trenches.  Their fire could also suppress hostile siege batteries.  Seacoast mortars could penetrate the decks of wooden ships and even threaten the deck plating of ironclad vessels.  Lastly, these could also kill men where other guns couldn't reach them

The 8-inch and 10-inch siege mortars had maximum ranges of 2,225 and 2,064 yards, respectively,  and the 13-inch seacoast mortar had a maximum range of 4,300 yards, but their effective ranges were much shorter. For the 8-inch siege mortar at a range of 800 yards, about 50% of the shells would fall within a 50-yard radius of the target. With the 10-inch siege mortars at 875 yards, about 60% of the shells would fall within a 40-yard radius of the target. The 13-inch seacoast mortar could be expected to be more accurate. 

Coehorn mortars were lighter mortars, designed to be brought well forward in the trenches.

With the replacement of masonry fortifications with earthen works, mortars became more important. Works that could resist the horizontal fire of guns were still vulnerable to the vertical fire of mortars.

Wooden mortars

The Union Army of the Tennessee, not having a proper siege train at the siege of Vicksburg, was forced to improvise. The artillerymen took short sections of gum-tree logs, bored them out to accept six or twelve pound shells, and hooped the logs with iron bands. These wooden mortars reportedly served well . Edward Porter Alexander reported that Confederate experiments with wooden mortars were not successful .

Mortar gallery

Rifled artillery

The Civil War was the first major war to see the use of rifled artillery. Rifling gave the guns greater velocity, range, accuracy, and penetrating power, making smoothbore siege guns obsolete. The ranges of these guns is somewhat problematic. However, the absence of suitable sights  and a good system of directing fire on targets that could not be seen from the gun, limited the effective range of the rifled guns.

The bombardment of Fort Pulaski demonstrated that rifled guns were extremely effective against masonry fortifications.  The reduction of Fort Macon two weeks later confirmed this.  Later experiences at the campaign against Charleston Harbor and the siege of Petersburg showed that rifled guns are much less effective against earthen field works.

4.5-inch siege rifle

The 4.5-inch siege rifle looks like a larger version of the 3-inch ordnance rifle and it is often called a 4.5-inch ordnance rifle. However, the 4.5-inch siege rifle was of conventional cast iron construction and did not use the welded wrought iron construction of the 3-inch ordnance rifle. The 4.5-inch siege rifle fired shells weighing about 30 pounds (depending on the specific type of shell). The tube weighed 3,450 pounds and was 133 inches long. The gun's only vice was that it suffered from excessive erosion of the vent caused by the hot gasses flowing through the vent when the gun was fired. The vent could become too large to fire the piece after 400 discharges. This problem could be remedied by insertion of a copper vent piece (bouche).

In addition to its use as siege artillery, two batteries of 4.5-inch siege rifles (8 guns total) accompanied the Army of the Potomac as "heavy" field artillery between 1862 and 1864. The big guns were intended for long range firing against Confederate artillery. Although the guns showed very good mobility, they saw little action.

James rifles

During the early part of the war, the Federal army lacked rifled siege artillery. To fill this gap, the army rifled existing smoothbore pieces with the system developed by Charles T. James. Firing shot and shells also designed by James, these newly rifled smoothbores gave good service during the bombardment of Fort Pulaski in April 1862. However they were retired from frontline service soon after.

Smoothbore artillery rifled with the James system

Parrott rifles

Robert Parker Parrott (1804–77), an 1824 graduate of the United States Military Academy, developed a new form of rifled artillery using a cast iron barrel with a reinforcing wrought iron band around the breech. He first produced 2.9-inch (10-pounder) and 3.67-inch (20-pounder) rifles for the field artillery. He later produced four larger rifled guns that were used as siege artillery. These heavy Parrott rifles became the mainstays of the Federal siege train.

4.2-inch (30-pounder) Parrott rifle

The 4.2-inch (30-pounder) rifles were the most widely used of the Parrott siege guns. The tubes were mounted on a conventional siege carriage. The early pattern guns had the elevating screw under the breech, while the newer pattern gun had a long screw running through the cascabel. The long elevating screws of the newer models were prone to breakage . The 4.2-inch Parrott rifles were preferred over the 4.5-inch siege rifles because of the superiority of Parrott shells over the various shells available for the 4.5-inch siege rifle. The 4.2-inch Parrott rifles did not have as great a propensity for bursting as found in the larger Parrott rifles. During the siege of Petersburg 44 4.2-inch Parrott rifles fired 12,209 rounds , but only one gun burst when a shell detonated before clearing the muzzle . One 4.2-inch Parrott rifle also burst during the campaign against Charleston harbor, but only after it had fired 4,606 rounds .

Two new examples of a Confederate-made variant of a 30-pounder Parrott were also employed in defensive positions at the Battle of Fredericksburg.  Both pieces burst in action there, one on the 39th and the other on the 54th discharge.  (Dew, p. 187)

6.4-inch (100-pounder) Parrott rifle

The 6.4-inch (100-pounder) Parrott Rifle was a potent siege gun capable of great accuracy and long range with heavy projectiles. For siege use it was mounted on a front pintle barbette carriage. It did, however, tend to burst. Of the three hundred 6.4-inch Parrott rifles in service with the U.S. Navy, 19 burst . During the campaign against Charleston harbor, one burst at 122 rounds and another burst at 1,151 rounds . The army retained their enthusiasm for the guns. General Quincy A. Gilmore, commander of the Federal forces at Charleston, said "[t]here is, perhaps, no better system of rifled cannon than Parrotts; certainly none more simple in construction, more easily understood, or that can with more safety be placed in the hands of inexperienced men for use." . A 100-pounder was also fired from Fort DeRussy during the Battle of Fort Stevens in Washington, DC.

8-inch (200-pounder) Parrott rifle

The 8-inch (200-pounder) Parrott Rifle was essentially an enlarged 6.4-inch Parrott rifle with the same vices and virtues. The most famous 8-inch Parrott rifle was the "Swamp Angel" used for the bombardment of the city of Charleston. It burst on its 36th discharge.

10-inch (300-pounder) Parrott rifle

Only three 10-inch (300-pounder) Parrotts saw service during the war; all placed on Morris Island during the campaign against Charleston harbor. It was mounted on a center pintle, barbette carriage. It was essentially an enlarged 8-inch Parrott rifle, although it was believed to be somewhat more accurate than the 8-inch rifle . One 10-inch Parrott rifle on Morris Island was disabled soon after it first opened fire by the premature detonation of a shell, which blew about 18 inches off its muzzle. The ragged end of the muzzle was trimmed even by soldiers working with cold chisels, and the gun fired another 370 times without any appreciable difference in range or accuracy. The gun was subsequently permanently disabled by additional premature detonation of shells.

Parrott rifle gallery

Whitworth rifle

The Federal forces at Charleston used two British 5-inch Whitworth muzzle-loading rifles that had been captured aboard a blockade runner. Served by sailors of the blockading squadron, the guns proved to be entirely unsuccessful. Shells failed to take the rifling, exploded prematurely, and solid shot could not reach their target .   They could only be loaded by heavy blows with a handspike (a heavy wooden bar used to move a gun). One of them became disabled when the barrel slipped within the reinforcing sleeve, blocking the vent. This caused the navy to stop using the other Whitworth .

Naval guns

The navy has traditionally provided siege artillery to the army when needed. The Civil War was no exception to this rule. Seamen from the USS Wabash manned the Whitworth rifles and two 8-inch Parrott rifles during the campaign against Charleston harbor. Seamen also manned 5 navy XI-inch Dahlgren guns emplaced on Morris Island in 1864. In the siege of Vicksburg, the Federal Army of the Tennessee had no siege artillery, so the U.S. Navy placed at least two of their 8-inch guns into batteries ashore .

Confederate siege train

The Confederate Army had no siege train per se, as they did not engage in regular sieges. In defending the works that were the objects of Federal siege operations, the Confederates used a hodge-podge of weapons seized from Federal arsenals and fortifications, naval guns, Confederate-made versions of pre-war designs, and imported rifled guns, such as the Whitworth and Armstrong rifles.

The Confederate equivalents to the heavy Parrott rifles were the Brooke rifles, developed by John Mercer Brooke. They were cast iron guns with wrought iron breech bands like the Parrott rifles. They generally had a bore of 6.4 or 7 inches, and had single, double, and even triple bands.

During the siege of Petersburg the Confederate Army developed iron 12-pounder and 24-pounder Coehorn mortars. The rough iron pieces served very well.

Use of siege artillery during the American Civil War

Bombardment of Fort Pulaski

U.S. Army command decided to block Savannah, Georgia's access to the Atlantic Ocean by capturing Fort Pulaski downstream from Savannah on the Savannah River. Federal forces made an unopposed landing on Tybee Island December 24, 1861. Guns and supplies for the reduction of Fort Pulaski were landed on Tybee Island on February 21. The siege batteries were ready by April 9. Fort Pulaski was then armed with 48 guns, 20 of which bore on the batteries on Tybee Island- 14 smoothbore guns and columbiads, one 24-pounder Blakely rifle, and four mortars. The garrison was 385 men.

At sunrise April 10, 1862, the Federal forces formally demanded the surrender of Fort Pulaski, the demand was refused and at 8:15 AM the first shot was fired. Confederate return fire was vigorous, but not very accurate and Fort Pulaski was breached that afternoon. The James rifles and 4.2-inch Parrott rifles did most of the damage to the fort. The Federal mortar fire was very inaccurate. After nightfall, a desultory fire was kept up, to prevent the Confederates from repairing the breach. After sunrise on April 11, firing resumed, and the breach was rapidly enlarged and eleven Confederate guns dismounted or otherwise rendered unserviceable. At 2:00 PM, Fort Pulaski surrendered. Remarkably, only one man on each side was killed in the lengthy artillery engagement.

The fall of Fort Pulaski demonstrated that masonry fortifications were obsolete in the era of rifled artillery. General Gilmore, senior Federal engineer officer at Fort Pulaski, quoted a military treatise of the period as saying an "exposed wall may be breached with certainty at distances from 500 to 700 yards... and it will take from four to seven days firing..." . That had been with smoothbore guns; with rifled guns firing at distances of over 1,600 yards, the breach had been made in a day and a half.

Federal siege batteries at Fort Pulaski

Campaign against Charleston Harbor

In 1863, the Union Army began operations designed to reduce Fort Sumter, so that the U.S. Navy could enter Charleston harbor and capture the city. On July 10, Federal forces on Folly Island, South Carolina, crossed Light House Inlet and landed by boats on the southern tip of Morris Island.   Two unsuccessful infantry assaults were made against Fort Wagner, the second assault being led by the 54th Massachusetts Volunteer Infantry. On July 21, General Quincy Adams Gillmore began laying down batteries for the bombardment of Fort Sumter and Fort Wagner. Later a battery was created for guns to bombard the city of Charleston.

The campaign against Charleston Harbor was successful by many measurements. Morris Island was occupied, Fort Sumter was reduced, and the presence of Federal batteries sweeping the main channel into the harbor, effectively closed Charleston as a port for blockade runners. However, the long struggle on Morris Island gave the Confederates time to strengthen the harbor's other defensive works, and the U.S. Navy did not enter Charleston Harbor until after General William T. Sherman's advance through South Carolina finally forced the Confederates to evacuate the city on February 17, 1865.

Bombardment of Fort Sumter

Work on most of the batteries for the pieces that were to bombard Fort Sumter was completed by August 16, 1863, and firing began the next day. By August 23, Fort Sumter was a ruin. 5,009 projectiles had been fired, with about half striking the fort. All of the parapet gun were dismounted or seriously damaged and the fort was no longer an effective part of the defenses of Charleston Harbor . From August 23–30, a desultory fire was directed on Fort Sumter to hinder repairs and the remounting of guns. On August 30–31, Fort Sumter was bombarded again, completing the destruction of the parapet . U.S. Navy forces attempted a landing against Fort Sumter on the night of September 8–9, 1863. It was defeated by Confederate infantry forces who had occupied the ruins.

Batteries for bombardment of Fort Sumter

Bombardment of Fort Wagner

After the failed infantry assaults, Gilmore decided to attack Fort Wagner by regular approaches using saps and parallels. On July 19, 1863, the first parallel was dug near the pre-existing Federal lines. Saps were driven forward and a second parallel was established by July 23. The second parallel contained batteries directed against both Fort Wagner and Fort Sumter. The Atlantic Ocean flank of the second parallel was anchored by "Surf Battery" built below the high tide line. The "Surf Battery" was armed with field howitzers and Requa volley guns (proto-machine guns capable of firing 175 rounds per minute) to defend the Federal trenches from Confederates sorties up the beach. Coehorn, 8-inch, and 10-inch mortars were used by the Federal troops as their trenches approached Fort Wagner and field artillery was placed in the trenches to defend against possible Confederate sorties.

While Fort Wagner was subject to near constant bombardment from the batteries listed in the table below, as approaches neared the fort's ditch, the bombardment increased. Fire from U.S. Navy ships, particularly the USS New Ironsides, proved very effective. The navy were able to skip the round shells from their XI-inch Dahlgren guns off the water, over the ramparts, and into the fort. Several heavy Parrott rifles that had been directed against Fort Sumter shelled Fort Wagner on September 5 and 6, 1863. Over 1,400 shells from 6.4-inch (100-pounder) Parrott rifles, 8-inch (200-pounder) Parrott rifles, and a 10-inch (300-pounder) Parrott rifle were fired into Fort Wagner . The destructive bombardment and the imminent Federal assault forced the Confederate garrison to evacuate both Fort Wagner and Fort Gregg during the night of September 7–8, 1863. A Federal officer inspecting the fort after its occupation said "Notwithstanding the heavy fire of this bombardment, together with all the fire Fort Wagner had been subjected to since the commencement of our attack, from land and naval batteries, its defenses were not materially injured; that is to say, the parapets, bomb-proofs, and traverses of sand still remained and would have afforded shelter to infantry behind them, though greatly tossed about and torn up by our projectiles, but, under our fire, it was impossible to serve their artillery, nor could they expose themselves outside of their bomb-proof for an instant" .

Batteries for bombardment of Fort Wagner

Bombardment of the city of Charleston

Gilmore determined to bombard the city of Charleston. Under the existing rules of warfare, Charleston was a legitimate target. It was fortified, contained weapons factories, and was a port for blockade runners who carried contraband of war. But more importantly, Charleston was the symbol of rebellion. It was there that South Carolina became the first state to secede. The firing on Fort Sumter in 1861, which started the war, only increased the North's belief that Charleston's destruction was just retribution. .

Using tremendous skills and ingenuity, Gilmore's engineers constructed the "Marsh Battery" in the marsh between James Island and Morris Island. An 8-inch Parrott Rifle, nicknamed the "Swamp Angel," was mounted in the battery, and began firing at the city at 1:30 AM, August 22, 1863. At a range of 7,900 yards, the gun was aimed by taking compass bearings off St. Michael’s church’s steeple. The first night, 10 incendiary and 6 explosive shells were fired into the city. The gun was not fired on the 23rd. On August 24, on firing its 36th round, the Swamp Angel burst. In its short life, the Swamp Angel made artillery history as it was the longest-ranged artillery bombardment up to that date, and it was the first time artillery had been aimed by compass bearing . The Swamp Angel was not replaced in the Marsh Battery, but after the fall of Fort Wagner and Fort Gregg Federal batteries located in and near Fort Gregg (renamed Fort Putnam) resumed fire on Charleston, continuing until the city was evacuated.

Siege of Petersburg

During the siege of Petersburg, no attempts were made by Federal artillery to level the Confederate works. Attempts to clear the abatis in front of the works by gunfire were unsuccessful. The rifled guns were therefore used to keep down the Confederate fire, annoy their working parties, interfere with traffic on the Petersburg bridges, and to repel or support assaults. Rifled guns in Federal batteries on the James River were used against the Confederate James River Flotilla .

With rifled guns unable to harm opposing forces behind earthen field works, mortars became more important. Federal forces fired over 40,000 mortar rounds during the siege, and the Confederates returned a nearly equal fire .

The Federal forces mounted a 13-inch Coehorn mortar on a railroad flatcar. This mortar was nicknamed the Dictator.  The car was fired from a section of the Petersburg and City Point Railroad where moving the car along a curve in the track trained the gun on different targets along the Confederate lines. When charged with 14 pounds of powder the mortar would recoil less than two feet on the flatcar, but the flatcar would recoil 10 to 12 feet on the tracks. The plane of fire had to be nearly parallel to the tracks, to allow the flatcar to recoil and avoid dismounting the mortar, but by using a curved section of track a wide traverse could be achieved. Fire from the Dictator was very effective. At a range of 3,600 yards, one round was reported as having blown a Confederate field gun and carriage above the parapet of the Confederate works . The Dictator silenced the Confederate guns on Chesterfield Heights to prevent them from enfilading the right end of the Union line.

Federal siege train at the siege of Petersburg April 2, 1865

Source: 

Notes: The 8-inch siege howitzer is not reported to have been fired .

The presence of the Confederate 4.6-inch Brooke rifle in the Federal siege train is unexplained. It was emplaced in Fort Cummings and could presumably have fired ammunition designed for the 4.5-inch siege rifle. It is also confusingly reported as being of English manufacture .

See also

 Civil War Defenses of Washington
 Field artillery in the American Civil War
 Seacoast defense in the United States

References

Bibliography

External links

Civil War Field Fortifications Web Site
Civil War Artillery Projectiles

American Civil War artillery
Siege artillery